Mervyn Hart "Merv" Harvey (7 July 1922 – 21 November 1987) was an Australian rules footballer who played with Collingwood in the Victorian Football League (VFL).

Notes

External links 

Profile from Collingwood Forever

1922 births
1987 deaths
Collingwood Football Club players
Australian rules footballers from Melbourne
People from Fitzroy, Victoria